Social Democratic Youth is the youth organisation of the Social Democratic Party of Portugal and it is commonly known by its initials, JSD. Founded by Francisco Sá Carneiro, the JSD has become an essential basis of the PSD itself. Its activity is recognized in election campaigns, with a crucial position in terms of mobilization and as a "laboratory of ideas of the party". While defending the values affirmed by the Social Democratic Party, the JSD is a structure with its own identity and, therefore, works in an autonomous manner in respect to the party.

Nowadays, the JSD has mainly based his political activity in areas such as Education, Entrepreneurship, Employment, Housing, Environment, Addiction and Childhood Obesity. In addition to this, the JSD defends a constitutional review of the Portuguese Constitution, and advocates European integration, employment, culture and environment, generational issues in which the JSD focuses its intervention.

List of presidents
 António Rebelo de Sousa (May 1975 – Dec 1978; General Secretary)
 António Lacerda de Queiroz (Dec 1978 – Nov 1982)
 Pedro Pinto (Nov 1982 – Oct 1986)
 Carlos Coelho (Oct 1986 – Mar 1990)
 Pedro Passos Coelho (Mar 1990 – Dec 1995)
 Jorge Moreira da Silva (Dec 1995 – Sep 1998)
 Pedro Duarte (Sep 1998 – Sep 2002)
 Jorge Nuno Sá (Sep 2002 – Mar 2005)
 Daniel Fangueiro (Mar 2005 – Apr 2007)
 Pedro Rodrigues (Apr 2007 – Nov 2010)
 Duarte Marques (Nov 2010 – Dec 2012)
 Hugo Soares (Dec 2012 – 14 Dec 2014)
 Simão Ribeiro (Dec 2014 – Apr 2018)
 Margarida Balseiro Lopes (Apr 2018 – Jul 2020)
 Alexandre Poço (Jul 2020 - Present)

External links
 Official homepage of JSD

References

Youth wings of political parties in Portugal
International Young Democrat Union
Social Democratic Party (Portugal)